The Energy Regulators Association of East Africa (EREA) is a non-profit organisation mandated to spearhead harmonisation of energy regulatory frameworks, sustainable capacity building and information sharing among the List of energy regulatory bodies in the East African Community. Its key objective is to promote the independence of national regulators and support the establishment of a robust East African energy union.

Foundation and mission
On 28 May 2008, four national energy regulatory authorities voluntarily signed a "Memorandum of Understanding" for the establishment of the Energy Regulators Association of East Africa (EREA). Subsequently, it was recognized by the 8th Sectoral Council on Energy of East African Community (EAC) as a forum of energy regulators in the EAC on 21 June 2013. It was registered by the United Republic of Tanzania on 23 May 2019 into a company limited by guarantees and without share capital under the Companies Act, 2002, and the Memorandum of Association. The EREA represents seven members – the national energy regulators from the EAC Member States.

The EREA works closely with the EAC, African Union Eastern Africa Power Pool (EAPP)-Independent Regulatory Board (IRB), National Association of Regulatory Utility Commissioners and The Regional Association of Energy Regulators for Eastern and Southern Africa (RAERESA). EREA's seat is in Arusha, Tanzania.

Objectives and functions
EREA is composed of nine Key Result Areas and the objectives are summarised as follows:

 Facilitating the harmonization of NRI’s policies, tariff structures and legislation in the Member States;
Sustainable Capacity Building through the establishment of the Energy Regulation Centre of Excellence(ERCE) to support regional member institutions
contribute to the advancement of research on regulatory issues
Promoting regional co-operation in the planning and development of an integrated energy market and infrastructure.
Promoting independent regulation in the East African Community.

EREA was established to also, amongst other objectives; strengthen economic, commercial, social, cultural, political, technological and other ties for fast balanced and sustainable development within the East African region.

Members and Governance 

EREA members include Energy and Water Utilities Regulatory Authority (EWURA) of Tanzania, Energy Petroleum Regulatory Authority (EPRA) of Kenya, Zanzibar Utility Regulatory Authority (ZURA) of Zanzibar, and Petroleum Authority of Uganda (PAU) of Uganda. Others include Electricity Regulatory Authority (ERA) of Uganda, Rwanda Utilities Regulatory Authority (RURA) of Rwanda and Autorité de Régulation des secteurs de l’Eau potable et de l’Energie (AREEN) of Burundi. EREA is also supporting the Government of the Republic of South Sudan to establish an independent regulatory authority which will eventually be integrated within the regional regulatory association.
The Association has four organs and applies the principle of rotating leadership of the organs among its members. These organs are: 
(a)	The General Assembly (G.A.) – the supreme organ, is currently chaired by AREEN-Burundi. The GA is the meeting of chairpersons and chief executive officers of the national regulatory authorities in EAC.
(b)	The Executive Council – is currently chaired by EWURA-Tanzania. This a meeting of Chief Executive Officers/Director Generals of the national regulatory authorities in EAC.
(c)	The Secretariat - is headed by the Executive Secretary-Dr. Geoffrey Aori Mabea, appointed for a three-year term, and the position is on a rotational basis among the countries of East African Community.
(d)	Three Specialized Portfolio Committees for handling Economic, Legal, and Technical matters of the Association.

EAC Electricity Markets

The East African Community's Electricity Regulatory Index(ERI)

The African Development Bank carried out a third electricity regulatory index for Africa to assess the three main pillars of regulation. They included: the Regulatory Governance Index (RGI); the Regulatory Substance Index (RSI); and the Regulatory Outcome Index (ROI). In the report, the East African Community members states shows a significant improvement in the key regulatory index. According to the African Development Bank, Uganda has maintained the top position for two consecutive years.

End User Electricity Tariff

Electricity Statistics for EAC

See also
 Common Market for Eastern and Southern Africa  (COMESA-RAERESA)
 Energy Regulators Regional Association (ERRA)
 Eastern Africa Power Pool (EAPP-IRB)

References

External links
 EREA website
 EREA Magazine website
 Energy Regulation Centre of Excellence

Organizations established in 2008
Energy markets
International energy organizations
East African Community
Energy regulatory authorities
Non-profit organizations based in Africa